Mount Warren is a 12,327-foot-elevation (3,757 meter) summit located in the Sierra Nevada mountain range, in Mono County, California, United States. The mountain is set within the Hoover Wilderness, on land managed by Inyo National Forest.

History
The mountain's toponym was officially adopted by the United States Board on Geographic Names to honor Gouverneur K. Warren (1830–1882), topographer and United States Army general during the American Civil War. Mt. Warren is labeled on the 1901 Bridgeport Quadrangle map.

The first ascent of the summit was made by Vitus Wackenreuder, a cartographer with the California Geological Survey, sometime during the 1860s before 1868.

Climate
Mount Warren is located in an alpine climate zone. Most weather fronts originate in the Pacific Ocean, and travel east toward the Sierra Nevada mountains. As fronts approach, they are forced upward by the peaks (orographic lift), causing moisture in the form of rain or snowfall to drop onto the range. Precipitation runoff from this mountain drains to Mono Lake.

See also

 List of mountain peaks of California

Gallery

References

Mountains of Mono County, California
North American 3000 m summits
Mountains of Northern California
Sierra Nevada (United States)
Inyo National Forest